Cophomantella bythota is a moth in the family Lecithoceridae. It was described by Edward Meyrick in 1916. It is known from Ghana.

The wingspan is about 18 mm. The forewings are deep bronzy purple and the hindwings are dark fuscous.

References

Moths described in 1916
Cophomantella
Taxa named by Edward Meyrick